Labeobarbus macrolepidotus is a species of ray-finned fish in the genus Labeobarbus which is found in the lower Congo River and the Kasai River in the Democratic Republic of the Congo and Angola.

References 

 

macrolepidotus
Taxa named by Jacques Pellegrin
Fish described in 1928